Knockmore GAA is a Gaelic Athletic Association club, based in Knockmore, County Mayo, Ireland. The club is a member of the Mayo GAA county board, and fields Gaelic football teams in competitions run by the board.

The club was founded in 1960.

Achievements
 All-Ireland Senior Club Football Championship Runners-Up 1997
 Connacht Senior Club Football Championship Winners 1973-74, 1992–93,  1996–97
 Mayo Senior Football Championship Winners 1973, 1980, 1983, 1984, 1989, 1992, 1996, 1997, 2020, 2021

Notable player
 Kevin McLoughlin
James Ruddy

Ryan McDonnell

Colm Reape

References

Gaelic games clubs in County Mayo
Gaelic football clubs in County Mayo